Africa is a 1930 Walter Lantz cartoon short featuring Oswald the Lucky Rabbit.

Plot
Oswald is riding through the Egyptian desert on his camel. The camel, though looking real on the exterior, is actually mechanical because of the two ball-shaped pistons inside which Oswald manipulates with his feet like bike pedals. One day, a lion was running toward them. To defend himself, Oswald brought out a rifle but it malfunctioned. As a final resort, Oswald fired the ball pistons from the camel like a cannon and aimed into the lion's mouth. Terrified by its lumpy back, the lion runs away in panic.

Nearby where he is, Oswald saw an oasis and a palace. Upon seeing the apes dance and play instruments, the curious rabbit decides to join the fun. As he entered the palace, Oswald was greeted by the queen. The queen asked him who he is, and Oswald introduced himself in a song as well as giving advice for a possibly better lifestyle. Pleased by his visit, the queen asked Oswald if he would like to be her king. Oswald was at first uncertain, knowing he never met a queen, but immediately accepted. It turns out momentarily that the queen still has a king who shows up, then kicks Oswald out of the palace and into a pond full of crocodiles. Luckily, Oswald escapes unscathed and runs off into the desert.

Notes
Oswald's theme song is featured for the first time in this film. The song was briefly shown again at the beginning of Alaska, the following cartoon.

Reused footage
Some of the scenes in Africa were taken from the 1930 musical film "King of Jazz".

See also
 Oswald the Lucky Rabbit filmography

References

External links
Africa at the Big Cartoon Database
 
 

1930 films
1930 animated films
1930s American animated films
1930s animated short films
American black-and-white films
Films directed by Walter Lantz
Films set in Egypt
Oswald the Lucky Rabbit cartoons
Universal Pictures animated short films
Animated films about animals